Oxycera meigenii is a species of soldier fly in the family Stratiomyidae.

Distribution

This species is present in central and western parts of  Europe (Austria. Belgium, Bosnia and Herzegovina, Bulgaria, Russia, Croatia, Czech Republic, Denmark, France, Germany, Greece,  Hungary, Italy, Latvia, Lithuania, Moldova, Poland, Romania, Slovakia. Sweden. Switzerland and in Ukraine), in the Near East and in the East Palaearctic.

Habitat
This species occurs in wetlands, lakes and streams and in agricultural areas.

Description

These soldier flies have red antennae. On mesonotum of both sexes are present longitudinal yellow stripes, connected to humeral spots, in female abrupt at the middle. Scutellus is yellow with red tips. Also legs are yellow. Femora 1 and 2 in basal half and anterior tarsi are black. On the abdominal tergites 2–4 are present extensive oblique yellow lateral-markings and yellow apex.

Biology
Adults of Oxycera meigenii can be found in July.

Etymology
The name honours Johann Wilhelm Meigen.

Bibliography
Woodley, Norman E. (2001). A world catalog of the Stratiomyidae (Insecta: Diptera). North American Dipterists' Society. ISBN 978-9057820830.
Pape T. & Thompson F.C. (eds). (2019). Systema Dipterorum (version 2.0, Jan 2011). In: Species 2000 & ITIS Catalogue of Life, 2019 Annual Checklist (Roskov Y., Ower G., Orrell T., Nicolson D., Bailly N., Kirk P.M., Bourgoin T., DeWalt R.E., Decock W., Nieukerken E. van, Zarucchi J., Penev L., eds.). Digital resource at www.catalogueoflife.org/annual-checklist/2019. Species 2000: Naturalis, Leiden, the Netherlands. ISSN 2405-884X.
E. P. Narchuk in Bei-Bienko, G. Ya, 1988 Keys to the insects of the European Part of the USSR Volume 5 (Diptera) Part 2 English edition.

External links
 Diptera.info
 Observation.org
 researchgate.net

References 

Stratiomyidae
Insects described in 1844